Marco Antonio da Silva known professionally as DJ Marky, is a Brazilian drum and bass DJ.

Together with DJ Patife, XRS Land and Drumagick, Brazilians were forging a new sound in drum and bass that became popular around the world with releases such as LK and Só Tinha Que Ser Com Você.

Career
He was brought to the attention of the English DJ Bryan Gee, head of V Recordings, who saw Marky playing in a club in São Paulo in 1998. He invited the DJ to play in London. This experience resulted in a residency at the club Movement, a subsequent residency at The End club, work for the UK's BBC Radio 1, and global popularity.

Marky got started in drum and bass in 1992, but by 1997, he went to London and met DJ Hype and Goldie. In 1999, he was awarded "Best New DJ" by the UK music critics. The recording sessions of his album Working the Mix happened in his house, with two pick-ups, one mixer and vinyl albums. His appeal became more widespread after a two-hour set on BBC Radio 1's Essential Mix in March 2004, and his album In Rotation.

In 2006, DJ Marky played the Lovebox Festival in Victoria Park, east London, as one of the headline acts.
In 2012, DJ Marky was a special guest playing at Norman Jay MBE's "Good Times Sound System" at Notting Hill Carnival.

DJ Marky released the album Influences: Compiled & Mixed by DJ Marky through BBE music in August 2008.

Some of Marky's songs can be found on the video game, FIFA Street 2. DJ Marky has released music on Innerground Records (a subsidiary of Bulldozer Media).

DJ Marky was managed by Edo van Duijn and Oliver Brown until 2017.

Discography

Albums
My Heroes (2015)
Fabriclive 55 (2011)
In Rotation (2004)

Singles
"The Brazilian Job" (with DJ Patife & ESOM feat. Fernando Porto) (2001)
"LK (Carolina Carol Bela)" (with Xerxes de Oliveira & Stamina MC) (2002)
"Untitled / Brown Sugar" (2003)
"Special Lady / Montpellier" (with A Sides) (2005)
"Battle Mix Volume 2" (with Total Science & Ayah) (2007)
"Battle Mix Volume 3" (with Total Science) (2007)
"Moodswings Part 1" (with Muffler & Bungle) (2008)
"Super Bass / Outside Moon" (with Drumagick) (2009)
"Ya Thang" (2012)
"After Midnight / Break The Spell" (with Invaderz) (2013)
"Silly VIP / Ready To Go" (2017)

References

External links

  or  Official website
 Innerground Records
 DJ Marky Profile at The End
 RBMA Radio On Demand - On The Floor! - Live at The End, London - DJ Marky (Innerground, Sao Paulo)
 
 
 Dj Marky interview @ Mute/Control (Spanish)
 Dj Marky SoundCloud

Audio links
 DJ Marky mix from springeight festival
 DJ Marky Live at The End podcast

Brazilian drum and bass musicians
Brazilian DJs
Living people
1975 births
Electronic dance music DJs